
Evening Song or Songs may refer to:

Books
Evening Songs, cycle of poems by Vítězslav Hálek

Music
Abendlied (Evening song) by Gabriel Rheinberger
Abendlied (Evening song) by Matthias Claudius
"Evening Song", List of compositions by Modest Mussorgsky
Evening Songs, instrumental pieces by Kalervo Tuukkanen (1909-79) 
Večerní písně (Evening Songs) Op. 31 for voice and piano after poems by Vítězslav Hálek, List of compositions by Antonín Dvořák
Večerní písně (Evening Songs), List of compositions by Zdeněk Fibich
Vecerni pisne (Evening Songs) 1879 List of compositions by Bedřich Smetana
"Evening Song", song for voice & piano, A. 24 Charles Tomlinson Griffes
"Evening Song", by Henry Kimball Hadley (1871-1937)
 Serena (genre), 13th-century Occitan evening song

Albums
Evening Songs (Julian Lloyd Webber album)

See also
Evensong (disambiguation)